The Constitution of the State of Delaware of 1897 is the fourth and current governing document for Delaware state government and has been in effect since June 10 of that year.

Executive
The Governor is the executive officer of the State, and is chosen by the qualified electors of the State, once every four years, at the general election. The term of the Governor is for four years, from the third Tuesday in January following the election. A person may be elected Governor only twice. The Governor must be thirty years old, a citizen and inhabitant of the United States for twelve years before the day of the election, and for the last six years of that time an inhabitant of Delaware.

The Governor is commander-in-chief of the state armed forces including the militia and, with the consent of the State Senate, appoint the Secretary of State to serve at the pleasure of the Governor.

Legislation approved by the General Assembly is submitted to the Governor for approval. In the event approval is not given, the legislation is returned to the General Assembly, reconsidered, and may become law without the Governor's approval only if three-fifths of each House of the General Assembly approve it.

Members of the Delaware Constitutional Convention of 1897. The Convention convened in December 1896 and adjourned June 4, 1897.

John Biggs, President, Democrat from New Castle County
Edward G. Bradford
Martin B. Burris
William A. Cannon
Paris T. Carlisle, Jr.
Wilson T. Cavender
David S. Clark
J. Wilkins Cooch
Ezekiel W. Cooper
Robert W. Dasey
Joshua A. Ellegood
Charles B. Evans
James B. Gilchrist
Robert G. Harman
Edward D. Hearne
John W. Hering
Andrew J. Horsey
Andrew L. Johnson
Woodburn Martin
Elias N. Moore
George H. Murray
William P. Orr, Jr.
Nathan Pratt
Charles F. Richards
Lowder L. Sapp
William Saulsbury
William T. Smithers
William C. Spruance, Republican from New Castle County
Isaac K. Wright

Amendment procedure

The Delaware Constitution is unusual in that the legislature has authority to amend it without a referendum. Article XVI, Section 1, of the Delaware Constitution provides that

The people are notified of the proposed amendment through the newspaper publications and may make their views known, and give effect to their desires, by voting for or against those legislators who are seeking to amend the constitution.

See also
Delaware Constitution of 1776
Delaware Constitution of 1792
Delaware Constitution of 1831

References

External links
Text of the Delaware Constitution of 1897

Constitution of 1897
Delaware
1897 in Delaware
1897 establishments in Delaware
1897 in American law